Billboard Top R&B Records of 1958 is the year-end chart compiled by Billboard magazine ranking the top rhythm and blues singles of 1958. Due to the extent of cross-over between the R&B and pop charts in 1958, the song's rank, if any, in the year-end pop chart is also provided.

See also
List of Billboard number-one R&B songs of 1958
Billboard year-end top 50 singles of 1958
1958 in music

References

1958 record charts
Billboard charts
1958 in American music